Mikael Piltz (born 10 May 1967) is a Finnish professional golfer who played on the Challenge Tour and briefly on the European Tour.

Career
Piltz turned professional in 1989 and played on the Swedish Golf Tour. He then joined the Challenge Tour, where he was runner-up at the 1992 Volvo Finnish Open before winning the 1994 Volvo Finnish Open, following a playoff with Joakim Grönhagen. The win earned him an invitation to the 1995 Sarazen World Open at Chateau Elan Legends course in Braselton, Georgia. He made 11 starts and 5 cuts on the 1994 European Tour, finding himself back on the Challenge Tour, where he was runner-up at the 2001 Russian Open behind Jamie Donaldson.

Piltz represented Finland at four World Cups (1991, 1992, 1994, 2000) with a best finish of 21st together with Kalle Väinölä in 2000.

Professional wins (9)

Challenge Tour wins (1)

Source:

Nordic Golf League wins (6)

Sources:

Other wins (2)
 1995 Finnish PGA Championship
 1997 Finish Closed Championship

Team appearances
Amateur
European Boys' Team Championship (representing Finland): 1985
Professional
World Cup (representing Finland): 1991, 1992, 1994, 2000

References

External links

Finnish male golfers
European Tour golfers
1967 births
Living people
20th-century Finnish people